Yves Laon Emile Adrien Renouard (17 February 1908 – 15 January 1965) was a French medieval historian. He was professor at the University of Paris from 1955 until his death.

Renouard was elected a Corresponding Fellow of the British Academy in 1964.

References 

Corresponding Fellows of the British Academy
20th-century French historians
1908 births
1965 deaths
French medievalists
Historians of France
École Normale Supérieure alumni
Academic staff of the University of Paris
University of Bordeaux alumni